The Summerleaze Footbridge is a footbridge across the River Thames in England linking Dorney, Buckinghamshire and Bray, Berkshire; it is about two miles downstream of Maidenhead Bridge, on the reach above Boveney Lock.

The footbridge was built as a gravel conveyor belt, taking gravel from the construction of Dorney Lake, a nearby purpose-built rowing lake, and takes its name "Summerleaze" from the firm who built it in 1996.

See also
List of crossings of the River Thames

References

1996 establishments in England
Bray, Berkshire
Bridges in Berkshire
Bridges in Buckinghamshire
Bridges completed in 1996
Pedestrian bridges across the River Thames
South Bucks District